Brian Speaker is an American musician, music producer, and audio engineer working in New York City. He has worked with many acts in the city's anti-folk scene, including Jeffrey Lewis, Peter Stampfel, Hamell on Trial, and Brook Pridemore.

Selected discography

As performer
Revolution of One (2006)
Off This Planet (2007)

As producer, engineer, mixer
M Lamar – Souls on Lockdown (2010)
Elastic No-No Band – Fustercluck!!! (2010)
Crazy & the Brains – Let Me Go (2013)
Brook Pridemore – My Name Is Brook Pridemore and I Live in Brooklyn, NY (2014)
Hamell on Trial – The Happiest Man in the World (2014)
Crazy & the Brains – Good Lord (2014)
Jeffrey Lewis & The Jrams – A Loot-beg Bootleg (2014)
Night Moves – Pennied Days (2015)
Jeffrey Lewis & Los Bolts – Manhattan (2015)
Sam Barron - Just Couldn't Help Myself (2016)
St. Lenox – Ten Songs from My American Gothic (2016)
Brook Pridemore – Breakup Songs With Horns (2017)
Pinc Louds – Delancey St. Station (2018)
Jeffrey Lewis & Peter Stampfel – Works by Tuli Kupferberg (2018)
Barry Bliss – Anti-Lie (2019)
Two Feet – "Maria" (single) (2020)

References

External links
Official Brian Speaker site

American record producers
Living people
American male singers
Year of birth missing (living people)